Howard Graham Buffett (born December 16, 1954) is an American businessman, former politician, philanthropist, photographer, farmer, and conservationist.   He is the middle child of billionaire investor Warren Buffett. He is named after Howard Buffett, his grandfather, and Benjamin Graham, Warren Buffett's favorite professor.

Personal life
Howard G. Buffett grew up in Omaha, Nebraska with two siblings: older sister Susan and younger brother Peter.  He has been active in business, politics, agriculture, conservation, photography, and philanthropy.  In August 1977, he married Marcia Sue Duncan.   Also in 1977, he began farming in Tekamah, Nebraska.  His father purchased the property for $760,000 and charged him rent. Howard later married Devon Morse, born Devon Armour Goss. On October 14, 1983, they had a son, Howard Warren Buffett. Buffett currently resides in Decatur, Illinois, from where he oversees a  family farm in Pana, Illinois and three foundation-operated research farms, including over 1,500 acres in Arizona, and 9,200 acres in South Africa. He is an advocate of no-till conservation agriculture.

Business
Buffett was Corporate Vice President and Assistant to the Chairman  of Archer Daniels Midland Company from 1992 to 1995, Director of Archer Daniels Midland Company from 1991 to 1995, Director of the Board of Directors of The GSI Group from 1995 to 2001, Director of ConAgra Foods from 2002 to 2006, Director of Agro Tech Foods Ltd. until October 26, 2006, and Director at Sloan Implement. He became a Lindsay Corporation director in 1995, served as Chairman for a year from 2002 to 2003. and in 2008, announced he would let his term as a director expire in January 2010.

He is, a director of Berkshire Hathaway, Inc., and President of Buffett Farms.

Howard G. Buffett has been a Director of The Coca-Cola Company since December 9, 2010. From 1993 to 2004 he was a director of Coca-Cola Enterprises, the world's largest Coca-Cola Bottler.

In December 2011, Warren Buffett told CBS News that he would like his son Howard to succeed him as Berkshire Hathaway's non-executive chairman.

Politics
Buffett, a Republican, served as a County Commissioner in Douglas County, Nebraska from 1989 to 1992. He also served as the Chairman of the Nebraska Ethanol Authority and Development Board from 1989 to 1991. He is a former member of the Board of the Commission on Presidential Debates.

Buffett was sworn in as Sheriff of Macon County, Illinois on Friday, September 15, 2017.  He was selected to fill the remaining term of office after the resignation of former Sheriff Thomas Schneider.  Buffett has been an active volunteer with the Macon County Sheriff's Office for several years, having been appointed Undersheriff by Schneider.  Buffett, through the Howard G. Buffett Foundation has donated several million dollars to various law enforcement agencies and projects throughout central Illinois. As Sheriff the Howard G. Buffett Foundation continued to donate funds to purchase patrol rifles and radio earpieces for the Macon County Sheriff’s Office along with money to implement a Personal Patrol Vehicle Program.

In January 2019, the Phoenix New Times ran a 27-page investigative report potentially implying that Howard Buffett used money donated to his charitable foundation principally by his father to gain influence and obtain a position in the Cochise Country, Arizona Sheriffs Department possibly to conduct operations against migrants in the borderlands or to combat drug-runners. The operations implied by the report include the stockpiling or donation of weapons and a questionable defoliation campaign.

On May 3, 2021, Buffett announced he would run for the Republican nomination to challenge incumbent Democratic sheriff Tony Brown. On June 4, 2021, Judge Anna Benjamin ruled that Republican candidate Jim Root had actually defeated Democratic candidate Tony Brown by sixteen votes in the 2018 election. Brown, who was sworn in as Sheriff in 2018, chose to resign the position rather than appeal the ruling. On June 12, 2021, Buffett suspended his campaign for sheriff citing state legislation changing the requirement to serve as a county sheriff in Illinois.

Media

Buffett has published eight books on conservation, wildlife, and the human condition, and has written articles and opinion pieces for The Wall Street Journal and The Washington Post.  In 1996, Harvard published his thesis, The Partnership of Biodiversity and High-Yield Agricultural Production.

Books
In 2000, Buffett co-produced a book of photography with Colin Mead, Images of the Wild, an information source for traveling to wildlife areas in North America and Africa.

In 2001, he wrote On The Edge: Balancing Earth's Resources which focused on preserving world biodiversity, species and habitats.  Former Senator Paul Simon authored the foreword.

In 2002, Buffett wrote Tapestry of Life, a compilation of portraits taken in Bangladesh, Ethiopia, Ghana, India, and other countries with deep poverty and human need. Tom Brokaw authored the foreword.  Also in 2002, he published Taking Care of Our World, a book that teaches children about ecology.

In 2003, he co-wrote Spots Before Your Eyes with Ann van Dyk.  The foreword was authored by Dr. Jane Goodall.  Spots Before Your Eyes presents history and facts about the cheetah species.

In 2005, he published Threatened Kingdom: The Story of the Mountain Gorilla which provides information about the mountain gorilla's habitat and the challenges facing the species.

In 2009, he wrote Fragile: The Human Condition with the support of National Geographic.  The foreword was authored by Shakira Mebarak. Fragile: The Human Condition is the documentation of life stories in sixty-five countries.

In 2013, he co-wrote the New York Times Bestseller Forty Chances: Finding Hope in a Hungry World with his son Howard Warren Buffett.  The foreword was authored by Warren Buffett.

In 2018, he wrote Our 50-State Border Crisis: How the Mexican Border Fuels the Drug Epidemic Across America, with a foreword by Heidi Heitkamp and a preface by Cindy McCain.

Philanthropy
Buffett serves or has served on the National Geographic Council of Advisors, World Wildlife Fund National Council, Cougar Fund, Illinois and Nebraska Chapters of the Nature Conservancy, Ecotrust, and the Africa Foundation.  Buffett founded the Nature Conservation Trust, a non-profit Trust in South Africa to support cheetah conservation, the International Cheetah Conservation Foundation, and was a Founding Director of The Cougar Fund. In October 2007, Buffett was named a Goodwill Ambassador Against Hunger by the United Nations World Food Programme.  He later joined the boards of the Barefoot Foundation and the ONE Campaign. In March 2010, Buffett became a member of the Eastern Congo Initiative founded by Ben Affleck. "I joined Ben in this effort because I believe strongly in investing in sustainable solutions to humanitarian challenges," he said.  The following year in 2011, Buffett teamed up with the Bridgeway Foundation to fund a program.

The Howard G. Buffett Foundation
As the CEO and Chairman of the Howard G. Buffett Foundation (HGBF), Buffett has traveled to over 130 countries to document the challenges of preserving biodiversity and providing adequate resources to support human demands.  The HGBF supports projects in the areas of agriculture, nutrition, water, humanitarian, conservation, and conflict/unaccompanied persons. The HGBF focuses much of its funding on communities in Africa and Central America.
In 2007, the HGBF launched the Global Water Initiative with several organizations to address the declining fresh water supply and clean water to the world's poorest people.
In March 2014, The HGBF donated USD $23.7 million (RAND 255 million), as part of a joint three-year initiative between HGBF, the Nature Conservation Trust (NCT) and South African National Parks (SANParks), to combat the poaching of Rhino in South Africa. The HGBF has committed $200 million to develop the municipality of Tibú, which has the second largest coca crop in Colombia, and to help local farmers to substitute growing coca with legal crops like cacao. The HGBF was one of five philanthropic groups that received a combined $2.9 billion of Class B shares in Berkshire Hathaway from Warren Buffett in July 2020

Awards
Buffett has received the Order of the Aztec Eagle Award, the highest honor bestowed on a foreign citizen by the Mexican Government, an honorary PhD from Lincoln College and Honorary Doctorate of Human Letters from Penn State University. and has been recognized by the Inter-American Institute for Co-operation in Agriculture as one of the most distinguished individuals in agriculture. He has also won the Will Owen Jones Distinguished Journalist of the Year Award, World Ecology Award, George McGovern Leadership Award, National Farmers Union Meritorious Service to Humanity Award, Columbia University Global Leadership Award, Leader in Agriculture Award from Agriculture Future of America, and Special Service Award from the Association for International Agriculture and Rural Development, and the International Quality of Life Award. Buffett was among the nine people who were awarded the Igihango medal by Rwandan President Paul Kagame in 2017.

See also
 Warren Buffett (father)
 Susan Buffett (mother)
 Peter Buffett (brother)
 Astrid Menks Buffett (stepmother)
 Howard Warren Buffett (son)

References

External links
Atlantic profile
Bloomberg video: Howard G. Buffett interview (2011) on world agriculture, his endeavors, his philosophy.
Wall Street Journal Video: Howard Buffett is working against African famine.
Website Of Howard Graham Buffett

1954 births
Living people
American business writers
American conservationists
Farmers from Illinois
Place of birth missing (living people)
Philanthropists from Illinois
American photographers
Howard Graham Buffett
Businesspeople from Illinois
Businesspeople from Omaha, Nebraska
Businesspeople in agriculture
Conagra Brands
County supervisors and commissioners in Nebraska
People from Decatur, Illinois
Writers from Chicago
Writers from Omaha, Nebraska
Farmers from Nebraska
Ambassadors of supra-national bodies
World Food Programme people
People from Tekamah, Nebraska